The Lematang River is a river located in South Sumatra, Indonesia. It has a depth of  Lematang people live along the river.

References

Rivers_of_Sumatra